Lantyug is a rural locality (a settlement) in Kemskoye Rural Settlement, Nikolsky District, Vologda Oblast, Russia. The population was 119 as of 2002.

Geography 
Lantyug is located 74 km northwest of Nikolsk (the district's administrative centre) by road. Kostylevo is the nearest rural locality.

References 

Rural localities in Nikolsky District, Vologda Oblast